University of Heilongjiang is a national university in the city of Harbin, Heilongjiang Province, People's Republic of China.

The university was established in March 1941, in the revolutionary base area of the Chinese Communist Revolution, Yan'an. It dates back to the Russian Language Group, Number 3 school-level division, Chinese Military and Politics University of the Anti-Japanese invasion, an institute dedicated to the training of military translators.

History
With several names, it was called the Yan'an School of Foreign Languages (Chinese Military and Politics University of the Anti-Japanese invasion) in the early time of the 1940s. After the PLA liberation in 1946, the Foreign Language School moved to Harbin as an academic institution conducted by the HQ of Northeastern Democratic Army (also a group of the PLA). In 1958, the school was extended, and rebuilt as the University of Heilongjiang.

Reputation

University of Heilongjiang is a Provincial conducted 211 university and a Provincial key university. It is famous in languages, commercial law, Marxism philosophy, business study and water conservancy.

It offers the only Manchu language program in China.
The University of Heilongjiang's Russian Language Studies program is considered to be the best in China.
Russian center is the 1 of the only 3 Russian centers established in China by Russia.
Library of Heilongjiang University has 5.1 million books, and as such is the biggest library in Heilongjiang Province.
Xuefu bookstore of Heilongjiang University is also the largest bookstore in Heilongjiang Province.

Rankings
Civil and Commercial Law ranked 7#
Russian Philology ranked 1#
Japanese Philology ranked 10#
Arabic Philology ranked 9#
Translation ranked 12#
Business English ranked 5#
Chinese ethnic language and literature ranked 4#
Library Science ranked 7#
Marxist Philosophy ranked 4#
0101 Philosophy ranked 11#
0502 Foreign Language and Literature ranked 4#
Manchu philology, the only Manchu philology program in China, ranked 1#

Academics

Liberal Arts Colleges
College of Philology
College of Journalism and Communication
College of Historical and Cultural Tourism
College of Public Management and Philosophy
College of Marxism Philosophy
College of Economic and Business Administration
College of Information Management
College of Law
College of Fine Arts
College of Education
International Cultural Education College
Defense Education Institute (managed by university and Northern Military Area Command HQ)

Science Colleges
College of Mathematical Sciences
College of Physical Science and Technology
College of Electronic Engineering
College of Chemistry, Chemical Engineering and Materials
College of Computer Science Technology
College of Life Science
College of Software
College of Agricultural Resources and Environment
College of Architecture and Engineering
College of Information Science and Technology
College of Electrical and Mechanical Engineering
College of Water Conservancy and Electric Power

Language Colleges
College of Chinese Language and Literature
College of Russian Philology
College of Western (European) Languages
College of Eastern (Asian) Languages
College of Application of Foreign Language

Teaching Departments
Applied Foreign Language Teaching Department
Sports Department

Other Colleges
College of Vocational and Technical
Community College Department
Adult Education College
People's Armed College

Research Institutions
Russian Language Literature Research Center
The Manchu Language Culture Research Center
Russia Research Department
Cultural and Philosophy Research Center
Chinese-French (Economic) Institute (joint program with Paris Nanterre University, France)
Chinese-Russian Institute (joint program with Novosibirsk State University, Russia)
Graduate College (joint program with Far Eastern Federal University, Russia).

Campus
University of Heilongjiang consists of the main campus, south campus, Hulan campus, Jianqiao college campus (independent), People's armed forces college campus and Heilongjiang Biological Science college campus, with a total area of more than 191 million square meters and a total construction area of 1.16 million square meters. It has more than 34,000 students, with 30 sponsoring entities and teaching  college-level units and independent secondary college.

Heilongjiang University has five post-doctoral research mobile (work) stations; a level two subjects and 16 subjects have the right to grant a doctorate, 13 disciplines and 112 secondary-level subjects have the right to grant master's degree, and another 6 professional degree-granting; 2 national key disciplines, 2 subject groups, a one discipline, 21 provincial key disciplines for the second subject. Opening of the 10 disciplines, covering 75 undergraduate programs, including national characteristics, professional 10, 21 provincial key specialties.

It has equipment worth 300 million yuan, more than 5 million copies of book collections, with a capacity of 40,000 students, university city, and state-of-the-art laboratory building, teaching building, 2 libraries, gymnasium, 2 swimming gyms, 3 dining centers, school infrastructure, and broadband network, multimedia and other modern teaching resources.

Staff
University of Heilongjiang has strong teachers, teacher atmosphere, and talent gathered. The existing staff of more than 3,200, of which more than 2,000 full-time teachers, tutor 552 people, of teachers with senior professional titles and more than 900. Among them, was "National Renowned Teachers" 6 people, ranked 14th in college, out in the first local university; "National Excellent Teacher", "National Model Teacher" and other kinds of national, provincial honor winner of more than 200 people; named "National Outstanding professional and technical personnel," one person, the national "Outstanding Young Expert" 7, "returned students Achievement Award" winner of a people, "Putin Award" winners 1 people, "Pushkin Medal" winner of five people, "New Century Talents Project 100 million national candidate," 4, the Ministry of Education "in the New Century Excellent Talents" was selected and 8 of them, "enjoy special government allowances officer" 73

International cooperation
The University of Heilongjiang has substantive cooperation and exchanges with 140 colleges worldwide. These include the UK's Leeds University and Bradford University, the University of Illinois, USA, the University of Paris X, France, Hunan University, South Korea and Japan's Niigata University, and so on. In almost 30 years(from 1981), more than 8,500 students had studied here. Meanwhile, Heilongjiang University every year attracts a large number of students from South Korea, Japan, Russia, Germany, UK, Africa and the United States to study Chinese language and International business.

Heilongjiang University is the base of teaching Chinese as a foreign language in Heilongjiang Province. The university is the appointed institution of HSK and is the institution admitting international students under Chinese government scholarship program. University of Heilongjiang has the first Confucius Institute in Russia and a joint graduate school with Far Eastern Federal University, Russia.
University of Heilongjiang has created the "Northeastern base of International Chinese language promotion" with Jilin University, Liaoning University and Yanbian University.

University of Heilongjiang is host to a range of foreign exchange students, primarily Russian and Korean. In recent years, Fulbright Fellows studying Mandarin Chinese through the National Security Language Initiative have studied at Heilongjiang University.

Notable people

Ha Jin, the only Chinese writer who with a U.S. National Book Award, PEN / Faulkner Award in Fiction Award
Qi Huaiyuan: Former vice foreign minister, China's first foreign ministry spokesman, the 9th CPPCC member, vice director of the foreign affairs committee. 13th central committee alternate committee, the 14th central committee
Yan Mingfu: Chairman Mao Zedong's translator, former Minister of CPC Central Committee United Front Work Department, former Vice Chairman of the CPC Central Committee, former Vice Minister of Civil Affairs, the former president of China Charity Federation
Zhang Jinshu: Chairman Mao Zedong's Translator
Zhang Lian: Former Ambassador in Japan
Guan Hengguang: First Ambassador to Uzbekistan, former the Ambassador in Lithuania
Li Fenglin: Former Ambassador in Russia
Pan Zhanlin: Former Chinese Ambassador to Kyrgyzstan, Ukraine, Yugoslavia and Israel, now the Tenth CPPCC National Committee　
Wang Ganghua: Former ambassador in Ecuador
Zhang Dake: Former ambassador in Yugoslavia
Teng Shaozhi: Former ambassador in Bulgaria
Hou Zhitong: Former ambassador of China disarmament affairs
Wang Nongsheng: Ambassador In Papua New Guinea, Samoa
Zhang Lian:  Ambassador in Sri Lanka and the maldives
Wang Guixin: Ambassador in Norway, the Netherlands
Yu Longhuai: Ministry of Aeronautics and Astronautics, research institute 1, vice-president, “Aoxing”and“Long March 2k”Commander
Zhang zuoyi: Governor of Heilongjiang province, CCP 16th central committee
Yan Xuetong: Tsinghua University international research institute of international relations, the department head
Liu Donghui: Heilongjiang Province National People's Congress standing committee, deputy director, secretary
Zhu Lin: PRC StateCouncil DC office, director
Xu Ran, writer
Yan Mingfu: the National Committee of the Chinese People's Political Consultative Conference, Vice Chairman, The central committee of the communist party TongZhanBu, minister
Ye Zhengda: Lieutenant General
Xue Hong: Global domain management agencies user advisory committee, the executive committee
Fu Jianzhong: Xinzhou Group, Chairman
Wang Acheng: Writers Association of  Harbin, Chairman, Writers Association of Heilong Jiang Province, Vice Chairman
Meng Fanxu: Heilongjiang lawyers association, President
Zhou Airuo: Lu Xun literal College, president
Wang Liping: Deputy secretary of the CCP Shanghai committee, Vice chairman of the shanghai CPPCC
Jiang Daming, governor of Shandong Province
Wu Guohua: NPC standing committee, deputy director of Zhejiang province, the standing committee of the eighth construction, the 9th CPPCC national committee members
Li Shan:  Artist
Yuan Libo: Harbin Engineering University, College of Science, Dean
Yu Liancheng: China mechanical electronics (Thailand) Co., LTD. and Asia-pacific electron (Laos) Co., LTD, CEO
Deng Zhenbo: City University of Hong Kong, visiting scholar
Lu Shizhen: China social work education association, vice chairman
Liu Keli: China international trust and investment in science and technology limited liability company, VP
Yu Haijiang: The language learning center, consultant, 《Foreign abstract》Editor and deputy editor, 《Chinese-English dictionary collocation》editor
Zhuge Yibing, Renmin University Professor
Li Longyun, Writer
Hu Yongzhu, Lieutenant General, Chengdu Military Region
Du Yuxin: Heilongjiang provincial party committee, vice secretary of central committee alternate committee member
Liu Xiaojiang, admiral, former political commissar of the PLA Navy
Chen Qiushi: lawyer and journalist who provided coverage of the 2019-2020 Hong Kong protests and 2019-2020 Wuhan Coronavirus Outbreak

References

External links
 Official website
 Official Foreign Student website

 
Universities and colleges in Harbin
Educational institutions established in 1941
Universities and colleges in Heilongjiang
1941 establishments in China